Filon Dzhelaliy or Dzhulaibek was a Cossack colonel of Crimean Tatar descent  who served during the Khmelnytsky Uprising of 1648-1657 and one of the close associates of Bohdan Khmelnitsky. He originally served in the Pereyaslav Cossack regiment. In April 1648, he with Cherkassy regiment centurion B. Tovpigoy led a revolt of the registered Cossacks at Kam'jana Zavod'.

In 1648 he was appointed the colonel of the Kropivnyansky (Ichniansky) regiment. He participated in the Battle of Zhovti Vody in 1648, battle of Korsun, Pilyavetskoy Battle in 1648, Battle of Zboriv in 1649. He has served on important diplomatic missions to Turkey.

In October–November 1648, the Ukrainian diplomatic mission headed by Dzhulaybek signed with the Ottoman Empire a contract under which Ukraine was recognized by the state, and Crimean Tatars were forbidden to attack the Ukrainian lands.

In September 1650, Dzhulaybek headed the Ukrainian Embassy to Moldova owner Vladimir Lupula. During the battle Berestetskiœ 1651, he was elected hetman of the Cossacks clerks. He was appointed captain-general of the Hetman.

After 1654 there was a long time with his family in Selishche Sagunovka (Ukraine, Cherkasy region). After 1684 his fate is unknown.

References 

 История Ивана Франко
 Научные Записки № 39
 «Козацька еліта», НАН України, інститут політичних і етнонаціональних досліджень ім. І.Ф. Кураса, УДК 94(477)929
 Суспільно-політична сітуація в Україні у другій половині XVII—XVIIIст.

Khmelnytsky Uprising